

Excavations
 Start of salvage excavations at Nevali Cori, to be flooded by dam.

Finds
 March – British warship  (wrecked 1809) found at the mouth of the Río de la Plata.
 July – Fragment A of the Tel Dan Stele (9th–8th century BCE) is excavated in Israel.
 October 1 – Steamer Brother Jonathan (wrecked 1865) found off the coast of California.
 Portuguese nau Nossa Senhora dos Mártires (1605–06) found at the mouth of the Tagus.
 Rhinoceros horn spear end from 30,000 years BP found in Yana River delta, at the Yana Rhinoceros Horn Site.
 The Guodian Chu Slips, including the oldest known version of Laozi's Tao Te Ching and the previously lost Xing Zi Ming Chu, written on bamboo, are found in a tomb near Guodian, Jingmen (Hubei province of China) and dated before 300 BCE (later Warring States period).
 In Patara the Stadiasmus Patarensis is unearthed. The monumental milestone provides information on the Roman road network in the province of Lycia et Pamphylia, giving place names and distances.
 Remains of Homo heidelbergensis found at Eartham Pit, Boxgrove, England.

Publications
 Barry Cunliffe – Wessex to AD 1000 (Longman).
 Sarah Milledge Nelson – The Archaeology of Korea (Cambridge University Press).
  Х. Тодорова, Иван Вайсов (H. Todorova, Ivan Vaisov) – "Новокаменната епоха в България" ("The Neolithic period in Bulgaria") (Издателство Наука и Изкуство (Science and Art Publishing House), Sofia).

Events
Conservators use a sonar probe mounted with two miniature video cameras to remove any remaining clay from inside the Riace bronzes.

Deaths
 November 14 – Kim Won-yong, "father of Korean Archaeology", professor at Seoul National University (b. 1922).

See also
 Mesa Verde

References

Archaeology, 1993 In
Archaeology by year
Archaeology
Archaeology, 1993 In